The Connection is an ABC Movie of the Week that was broadcast on February 27, 1973, starring Charles Durning as an out-of-work newspaper reporter who becomes involved with jewel thieves.

Synopsis
Frank Devlin is a popular newspaper columnist who is now out of work and in debt. A young man he knows through his regular poker game, Sy McGruder, approaches him through his wife, June. Sy was one of the robbers and now wants to sell back the jewels to the insurance company.

Devlin agrees in return for ten percent of the proceeds. But Sy and his wife double-cross him. The movie ends with a high-speed chase through the West Side of Manhattan in which Sy and his wife are prevented from making off with the insurance money.

Cast
 Charles Durning as Frank Devlin
 Ronny Cox as Everett Hutchneker
 Zohra Lampert as Hannah
 Dennis Cole as Sy McGruder
 Heather MacRae as June McGruder
 Howard Cosell as Himself
 Mike Kellin as Pillo
 Dana Wynter as Eleanor Warren
 Richard Bright as BeeJay
 Joe Keyes Jr. as Dewey
 Tom Rosqui as Detective Phelan
 Christopher Allport as Richard Wilcox
 Norman Bush as Gilson
 Franklin Cover as Lee Harris
 Dan Frazer as Verplanck
 Frank Gio as Kloss
 Merwin Goldsmith as Summons Server
 Burt Young as Ernie

Reception
New York Times reviewer John J. O'Connor wrote that the plot "had holes wide enough to need a car chase or two" but praised the directing by Tom Gries and the performance by Charles Durning, whose character he described as resembling Jimmy Breslin.

References

External links

1973 television films
1973 films
1973 in American television
1973 crime drama films
ABC Movie of the Week
Films directed by Tom Gries
American crime drama films
1970s American films